The 2005 FINA Men's Water Polo World League  was the fourth edition of the annual event, organised by the world's governing body in aquatics, the FINA. After a preliminary round and a semifinal round, the Super Final was held in Belgrade, Serbia and Montenegro.

Preliminary round

Five teams from each pool advanced to the semifinal round. The semifinal round hosts (Canada and the United States) were guaranteed qualification, as was the Super Final host (Serbia and Montenegro).

Group A

Group B

Semifinal round

Three teams from each pool advanced to the final round. The final round hosts (Serbia and Montenegro) were guaranteed qualification.

Group A

Group B

Super Final

Group round

The top two teams advanced to the final, while the next two played for bronze.

5th place match

Bronze medal match

Gold medal match

Final ranking

Awards

References

 Sports123

2005
W
W
International water polo competitions hosted by Serbia and Montenegro